Astral Signal is a soul/funk influenced jazz album recorded in 1974 by the jazz keyboard player Gene Harris.

Harris covered the Chicago tune "Beginnings" on this album, one of the very few times that Harris can be heard as lead vocalist.

Track listing
"Prelude" (Jerry Peters) - 1:38
"Summer (The First Time)" (Bobby Goldsboro) - 3:32
"Rebato Summer" (Peters) - 0:44
"I Remember Summer" (Peters) - 2:03
"Don't Call Me Nigger, Whitey" (Sly Stone) - 3:44
"Losalamitoslatinfunklovesong" (Peters) - 3:06
"My Roots" (Harris) - 4:15
"Green River" (John Fogerty) - 3:01
"Beginnings" (Robert Lamm) - 5:50
"Feeling You, Feeling Me Too!" (Monk Higgins, Alex Brown) - 1:57
"Higga-Boom" (Harvey Mason, Sr.) - 5:57
"Love Talkin'" (Peters) - 4:47

Personnel
Gene Harris - keyboards, lead vocals
Oscar Brashear - trumpet 
George Bohanon - trombone, backing vocals
Keg Johnson - trombone, backing vocals
Sidney Muldrow - flugelhorn
Ernie Watts - reeds
Jerry Peters - piano, backing vocals
John Rowin - guitar
David T. Walker - guitar
Chuck Rainey - bass guitar 
Harvey Mason - drums
Jim Shifflett - unknown instrument
Trisha Chamberlain, Ann Esther Davis, Lynn Mack, Julia Tillman Waters, Luther Waters, Maxine Willard Waters, Oren Waters - backing vocals

References

Gene Harris albums
1975 albums
Blue Note Records albums
Albums produced by Jerry Peters
Jazz-funk albums